Estadio Municipal Pozoblanco is a multi-use stadium in Pozoblanco, Spain.  It is currently used mostly for football matches .  The stadium holds 5,000 people.  

Municipal Pozoblanco
Buildings and structures in the Province of Córdoba (Spain)

References